Tacopaya (from ) is a village in the Cochabamba Department in central Bolivia. It is the seat of the Tacopaya Municipality, the second municipal section of the Arque Province.

References

 www.ine.gov.bo

External links
 Map of Arque Province

Populated places in Cochabamba Department